Sam Lipsyte (born 1968) is an American novelist and short story writer.

Life
The son of the sports journalist Robert Lipsyte, Sam Lipsyte was born in New York City and raised in Closter, New Jersey, where he attended Northern Valley Regional High School at Demarest. He attended Brown University, receiving a Bachelor of Arts in English in 1990. At Brown, Lipsyte lived with Steven Johnson.

Lipsyte was an editor at the webzine FEED. His fiction and nonfiction have appeared in The Quarterly, The New Yorker, Harper's, Noon, Tin House, Open City, N+1, Slate, McSweeney's, Esquire, GQ, Bookforum, The New York Times Book Review, The Washington Post, The Los Angeles Times, Nouvelle Revue Française, The Paris Review, This Land, and Playboy, among other places.

Lipsyte's work is characterized by its verbal acumen and black humor. 
His books have been translated into several languages, including French, Russian, Italian, Spanish and Portuguese. 
His novel The Ask was published in the United States by Farrar, Straus and Giroux in 2010, and in the United Kingdom by Old Street Publishing. 
In May 2011, HBO announced development of a comedy, "People City," based on Lipsyte's work, with Lipsyte serving as writer and executive producer.

He lives in Manhattan and teaches fiction at Columbia University.

Awards
His novel Home Land was a New York Times Notable Book of the Year for 2005 and winner of the inaugural 2004 Believer Book Award. Venus Drive was named one of the 25 Best Books of 2000 by The Village Voice Literary Supplement. In 2008, he received a Guggenheim Fellowship.

Bibliography
Venus Drive,  Open City Books, 2000, 
The Subject Steve, Broadway Books, 2001, ; reprint Random House, Inc., 2002, 
Home Land, Flamingo, 2004, ; Macmillan, 2005, 
The Ask, Macmillan, 2010, 
The Fun Parts, Farrar, Straus and Giroux, 2012, 
Hark, Simon & Schuster, 2019, 
Friend of the Pod, Gagosian, 2022,  (novella)
No One Left to Come Looking for You, Simon & Schuster, 2022,

Anthologies
"Dear Miss Primatologist Lady", Four Letter Word: Invented Correspondence from the Edge of Modern Romance, Editors Rosalind Porter, Joshua Knelman, Simon and Schuster, 2008, 
"April Fool's Day", The revolution will be accessorized: BlackBook presents dispatches from the new counterculture, Editor Aaron Hicklin, HarperCollins, 2006,

References

External links
"I Start From a Place of Outrage and Sadness": A conversation on humor in fiction with Elisa Albert, Steve Almond, Brock Clarke, Sam Lipsyte, Zachary Martin, John McNally, and Deb Olin Unferth in Gulf Coast: A Journal of Literature and Fine Arts (24.2)
"The Dungeon Master" short fiction in The New Yorker
"Underground No More: The Rumpus Interview with Sam Lipsyte"
Sam Lipsyte interviewed at Gigantic magazine
"Face to Face with SAM LIPSYTE", Stop Smiling, Alex Abramovich, February 1, 2007
"This 'Home Land' is Your Land: The Sam Lipsyte IMterview", Gawker 
"Tip #37: Get a Head of Steam for your Self-Esteem", This Land
"Get a Head of Steam for Your Self-Esteem" Video Adaptation, This Land
a profile of Sam Lipsyte by Philip Connors in InDigest Magazine

1968 births
Living people
21st-century American novelists
American male novelists
American online publication editors
Columbia University faculty
Jewish American novelists
Northern Valley Regional High School at Demarest alumni
Brown University alumni
People from Closter, New Jersey
People from New York City
Novelists from New Jersey
Writers from New York City
American male short story writers
Believer Book Award winners
21st-century American short story writers
21st-century American male writers
Novelists from New York (state)
21st-century American Jews